The Grand Pacific Junction is an historic district in Olmsted Falls, Ohio.

The district contains several buildings dating back to the mid-1800s, such as the Grand Pacific Hotel. The hotel and other buildings were renovated during the 1990s and are occupied today by retail establishments.

History 
The district contains about 30 buildings and storefronts today. A few of the oldest buildings are the Jail house, built in 1860, and the Granary building, built in 1875. Both were renovated in the late 1900s and serve different uses today. The Granary building used to be a storage and market for grain and feed

Grand Pacific Hotel building 
The Grand Pacific Hotel was erected in 1840.  It served as a hotel until 1888 when Philip Simmerer bought it and turned it into a hardware store. it also housed a dentist's and doctor's office on the third floor. To make it easier for customers to access those offices without having to go through the store, a staircase was added on the south side of the building.  It continued as a store until the 1970s.

The Grand Pacific Hotel was then owned by Bill Kucklick, and he renamed it Kucklick's Village Square Annex. On October 10, 1975, it was put on the National Register of Historic Places, and was known in the register for having Greek Revival-style architecture.

In 1989, Clint Williams, a realtor, bought the building and began restoring it, along with the rest of the Grand Pacific Junction. Williams removed the staircase on the south side of the building and added six dormers on the roof, two more on the south side and four on the north side. Inside the hotel, Williams added another room, changed the configuration of the windows and doors, and installed of a wooden bar in the rear of the building's interior. The renovations were completed in August 1992,

The Grand Pacific Hotel building now serves as a banquet room.

Restoration of district 
During the restoration of the other district buildings Williams added electrical, heat and air conditioning, and sewers.  He also redid the  windows, dormers and siding. Williams also built a gazebo built overlooking the creek 

Williams also moved a 1922 Vulcan locomotive and a caboose into the district. The train was then painted.

Heritage Days 
The town of Olmsted Falls sponsors a four-day fair and parade each year in early August,

Buildings Present Day 
The old jail house is now the Emerald Winds Honey Shoppe. The depositors building is  an Italian restaurant called Matteo's. The old P. Simmerer's Flour and Feed shop is now Creekside Vintage antiques store, and the Hardware store is now Clementine's Tea Room.

References 

1840 establishments in Ohio
19th century in Ohio
Historic districts in Cuyahoga County, Ohio
History of Ohio